Patna Women's Training College is a women's B.Ed. college situated in Patna, Bihar. The college, under Patna University, is also approved by the National Council for Teacher Education (NCTE) and the  University Grants Commission (UGC).

See also
 List of teacher education schools in India

References

External links
Patna Women's Training College

Colleges affiliated to Patna University
Colleges of education in India
Women's universities and colleges in Bihar
Universities and colleges in Patna
Educational institutions in India with year of establishment missing